Michael Andrew Clemens (born c. 1972) is an American development economist.

He is a senior fellow and research manager at the Center for Global Development (CGD), a Washington D.C.-based think tank, where he leads the Migration and Development initiative and serves as CGD's Research Manager. Clemens is also a Research Fellow of IZA, the Institute for the Study of Labor in Bonn, Germany, and an affiliate of the Financial Access Initiative, a research center housed at the Wagner Graduate School of Public Service at New York University.

Research 

Clemens' current work focuses on the effects of international migration on people from and in developing countries. Clemens leads the Migration and Development Initiative.

One of his most-cited works on migration is Economics and Emigration: Trillion-Dollar Bills on the Sidewalk published in the Journal of Economic Perspectives in 2011.  In this paper, he investigates why economists spend much more time studying the movement of goods and capital and much less time studying the movement of people. He sketches a four-point research agenda on the effects of emigration.

Clemens has also written about aid effectiveness, including an article for the Journal of Development Effectiveness: "When does rigorous impact evaluation make a difference? The case of the Millennium Villages." Using a high-profile case, the Millennium Villages Project, an experimental and intensive package intervention to spark economic development in rural Africa, he and his co-authors illustrate the benefits of rigorous impact evaluation by showing the estimates of the project’s effects depend heavily in evaluation method. He also wrote Counting Chickens When They Hatch: Timing and the Effects of Aid on Growth for the Royal Economic Society’s Economic Journal, examining the cross-country relationship between foreign aid and economic growth.

Initiatives 
Following the 2010 Haiti earthquake, Clemens led an effort to make Haitians eligible for H-2A and H-2B low-skill temporary work visa program arguing that the economic impact of migration would be far more beneficial than any foreign assistance or aid to the country. In January 2012, the US government added Haiti to the list of countries eligible to participate in the H-2 visa program.

References

External links 
 CGD expert profile
 Google Scholar profile
 The Biggest Idea in Development that No One Really Tried (VIDEO)
 

1970s births
Living people
21st-century American economists
American development economists
California Institute of Technology alumni
Johns Hopkins University alumni
Harvard University alumni
Center for Global Development
Migration economists